Calyptraea helicoidea is a species of sea snail, a marine gastropod mollusk in the family Calyptraeidae, the slipper snails or slipper limpets, cup-and-saucer snails, and Chinese hat snails.

Description

Distribution
This marine species occurs off Port Elisabeth and East London, South Africa.

References

 Kilburn, R.N. & Rippey, E. (1982) Sea Shells of Southern Africa. Macmillan South Africa, Johannesburg, xi + 249 pp.

External links

Calyptraeidae
Gastropods described in 1883